The Romania–Ukraine border  is the state border between Romania and Ukraine. It consists of both a land and a maritime boundary. It is part of the external border of the European Union (since Romania's accession to the EU in January 2007).

For the maritime part, see Maritime Delimitation in the Black Sea case.

Location
The land border consists of two parts: the northern part stretches across Carpathian Mountains region roughly west–east from the Hungary-Romania-Ukraine tripoint to the northern Moldova-Romania-Ukraine tripoint. It starts along the Tisza River (through Maramureș) and runs across the historical region of Bukovina in the Eastern Carpathians. The southern part stretches between Budjak and Dobrudja regions roughly west–east from the southern Moldova-Romania-Ukraine tripoint to the maritime Romania-Ukraine boundary. It runs along the Danube River, its Chilia branch (most northern branch) of its delta to the Black Sea. Until Soviet occupation of Bessarabia and Northern Bukovina, Dniester (Nistru) river used to serve as international border between Ukraine (later the Ukrainian SSR) and Romania.

History
The border is mostly inherited from the Romania–Soviet Union border, with some border disputes, most notable being the Snake Island issue. On 4 July 2003 the President of Romania Ion Iliescu and the President of Russia Vladimir Putin signed a treaty about friendship and cooperation. Romania promised not to contest territories of Ukraine or Moldova, which it lost to Soviet Union after World War II, but requested that Russia as a successor of the Soviet Union recognized its responsibility in some form for what had happened.

Nonetheless, the very next year in 2004 Romania contested Ukrainian maritime territory around the Snake Island in the International Court of Justice in what became known as the Maritime Delimitation in the Black Sea case. Romania was able to partially win the case.

Border crossings and checkpoints

Odesa Oblast (Ferry)
only in Budjak area across the Danube
 Isaccea — Orlivka (international) 
 Galați — Reni (local)
 Plauru — Izmail (local)
 Chilia Veche — Kiliya (local)
 Periprava — Vylkove (local)

Zakarpattia Oblast
 Valea Viseului — Dilove (international) railway
 Câmpulung la Tisa — Teresva (international) railway
 Sighetu Marmației — Solotvyno (international)  (weight restriction < 3.5 ton)
 Halmeu — Nevetlenfolu (international)    railway

Chernivtsi Oblast
 Siret — Terebleche (international) 
 Vicovu de Sus — Krasnoilsk (international)

Ivano-Frankivsk Oblast
 none

Local border traffic
In 2014, Romania and  Ukraine signed a provisional agreement on local border traffic. It applies to the residents within the 30 km border area extendable to 50 km to accommodate larger administrative units extending beyond the 30 km zone, listed in Annex 1 to the Agreement.

The agreement was subject to the completion of the necessary internal formalities. The Romanian side completed them in March 2014. The Ukrainian side complete its arrangements in May 2015. The agreement covers 662 localities in Ukraine (Transcarpathia, Ivano-Frankivsk, Odesa, Chernivtsi oblasts). It is applicable to about 2 million Ukrainian and Romanian residents.

See also
State border of Romania
State Border of Ukraine
:Category:Romania–Ukraine border crossings

References

Further reading

"Hungary-Slovakia-Romania-Ukraine ENPI Cross-border Cooperation Programme 2007-2013"

 
European Union external borders
Borders of Romania
Borders of Ukraine
International borders